Enver Halil Hoxha (16 October 190811 April 1985) was an Albanian communist politician who was the authoritarian ruler of Albania  from 1944 until his death in 1985. He was First Secretary of the Party of Labour of Albania from 1941 until his death. He was also a member of the Politburo of the Party of Labour of Albania, chairman of the Democratic Front of Albania, and commander-in-chief of the armed forces and ruled the country from 1944 until his death. He was the 22nd Prime Minister of Albania from 1944 to 1954 and at various times was both foreign minister and defence minister of the People's Socialist Republic of Albania.

Hoxha was born in Gjirokastër in 1908 and became a grammar school teacher in 1936. Following the Italian invasion of Albania, he joined the Party of Labour of Albania at its creation in 1941 in the Soviet Union. He was elected First Secretary in March 1943 at the age of 34. Less than two years after the liberation of the country, the monarchy of King Zog was formally abolished, and Hoxha rose to power as Albania's symbolic head of state.

During his 41-year rule, his government rebuilt the country, which was left in ruins after World War II, building Albania's first railway line, raising the adult literacy rate from 5–15% to more than 90%, wiping out epidemics, electrifying the country and leading Albania towards agricultural independence. It also outlawed religion, travelling abroad, private proprietorship, and closed or converted to secular uses all of Albania's religious facilities. His government imprisoned, executed, or exiled thousands of landowners, rural clan leaders, Muslim and Christian clerics, peasants who resisted collectivization, and disloyal party officials.

Hoxha's government was characterised by his proclaimed firm adherence to anti-revisionist Marxism–Leninism, i.e. Stalinism, from the mid/late-1960s onwards. After his break with Maoism in the 1976–1978 period, numerous Maoist parties around the world declared themselves Hoxhaist. The International Conference of Marxist–Leninist Parties and Organisations (Unity & Struggle) is the best-known association of these parties.

Early life

Hoxha was born in Gjirokastër in southern Albania (then a part of the Ottoman Empire), the son of Halil Hoxha, a Muslim cloth merchant who travelled widely across Europe and the US, and Gjylihan (Gjylo) Hoxha née Çuçi. The Hoxha family was attached to the Bektashi Order. In 1916 his father brought him to seek the blessing of Baba Selim of the Zall Teqe.

After elementary school, he followed his studies in the city senior high school "Liria". He started his studies at the Gjirokastër Lyceum in 1923. After the lyceum was closed, due to intervention of Ekrem Libohova, Hoxha was awarded a state scholarship for the continuation of his studies in Korçë, at the French language Albanian National Lyceum until 1930.

In 1930, Hoxha went to study at the University of Montpellier in France on a state scholarship for the faculty of natural science, but lost an Albanian state scholarship for neglecting his studies. He later went to Paris, where he presented himself to anti-Zogist immigrants as the brother-in-law of Bahri Omari.

From 1935 to 1936, he was employed as a secretary at the Albanian consulate in Brussels. After returning to Albania, he worked as a contract teacher in the Gymnasium of Tirana. Hoxha taught French and morals in the Korça Liceum from 1937 to 1939 and also served as the caretaker of the school library.

On 7 April 1939, the Albanian Kingdom was invaded by Fascist Italy. The Italians established a puppet government, called the Kingdom of Albania, under Shefqet Vërlaci. At the end of 1939, he was transferred to the Gjirokastra Gymnasium, but he soon returned to Tirana. He was helped by his best friend, Esat Dishnica, who introduced Hoxha to Dishnica's cousin Ibrahim Biçakçiu. Hoxha started to sleep in Biçakçiu's tobacco factory "Flora", and after a while Dishnica opened a shop with the same name, where Hoxha began working. He was a sympathiser of Korça's Communist Group.

Partisan life

On 8 November 1941, the Communist Party of Albania (later renamed the Party of Labour of Albania in 1948) was founded. Hoxha was chosen from the "Korça group" as a Muslim representative by the two Yugoslav envoys as one of the seven members of the provisional Central Committee. The First Consultative Meeting of Activists of the Communist Party of Albania was held in Tirana from 8 to 11 April 1942, with Hoxha himself delivering the main report on 8 April 1942.

In July 1942, Hoxha wrote "Call to the Albanian Peasantry", issued in the name of the Communist Party of Albania. The call sought to enlist support in Albania for the war against the fascists. The peasants were encouraged to hoard their grain and refuse to pay taxes or livestock levies brought by the government. After the September 1942 Conference at Pezë, the National Liberation Movement was founded with the purpose of uniting the anti-fascist Albanians, regardless of ideology or class.

By March 1943, the first National Conference of the Communist Party elected Hoxha formally as First Secretary. During WWII, the Soviet Union's role in Albania was negligible. On 10 July 1943, the Albanian partisans were organised in regular units of companies, battalions and brigades and named the Albanian National Liberation Army. The organization received military support from the British intelligence service, SOE. The General Headquarters was created, with Spiro Moisiu as the commander and Hoxha as political commissar. The Yugoslav Partisans had a much more practical role, helping to plan attacks and exchanging supplies, but communication between them and the Albanians was limited and letters often arrived late, sometimes well after a plan had been agreed upon by the National Liberation Army without consultation from the Yugoslav partisans.

Within Albania, repeated attempts were made during the war to remedy the communications difficulties which faced partisan groups. In August 1943, a secret meeting, the Mukje Conference, was held between the anti-communist Balli Kombëtar (National Front) and the Communist Party of Albania. To encourage the Balli Kombëtar to sign, the Greater Albania sections that included Kosovo (part of Yugoslavia) and Chamëria were made part of the Agreement.

Disagreement with the Yugoslav communists 
A problem developed when the Yugoslav Communists disagreed with the goal of establishing a Greater Albania and asked the Communists in Albania to withdraw their agreement. According to Hoxha, Josip Broz Tito did not believe that "Kosovo was Albanian" and Serbian opposition to the transfer made it an unwise option. After the Albanian Communists repudiated the Greater Albania agreement, the Balli Kombëtar condemned the Communists, who in turn accused the Balli Kombëtar of siding with the Italians. The Balli Kombëtar, however, lacked support from the people. After judging the Communists as an immediate threat, the Balli Kombëtar sided with Nazi Germany, fatally damaging its image among those fighting the Fascists. The Communists quickly added to their ranks many of those disillusioned with the Balli Kombëtar and took centre stage in the fight for liberation.

The Permet National Congress held during that time called for a "new democratic Albania for the people". Although the monarchy was not formally abolished, King Zog I of the Albanians was barred from returning to the country, which further increased the Communists' control. The Anti-Fascist Committee for National Liberation was founded, chaired by Hoxha. On 22 October 1944, the Committee became the Democratic Government of Albania after a meeting in Berat and Hoxha was chosen as interim Prime Minister. Tribunals were set up to try alleged war criminals who were designated "enemies of the people" and were presided over by Koçi Xoxe.

After liberation on 29 November 1944, several Albanian partisan divisions crossed the border into German-occupied Yugoslavia, where they fought alongside Tito's partisans and the Soviet Red Army in a joint campaign which succeeded in driving out the last pockets of German resistance. Marshal Tito, during a Yugoslavian conference in later years, thanked Hoxha for the assistance that the Albanian partisans had given during the War for National Liberation (Lufta Nacionalçlirimtare). The Democratic Front, dominated by the Albanian Communist Party, succeeded the National Liberation Front in August 1945, and the first post-war election was held on 2 December that year. The Front was the only legal political organisation allowed to stand in the elections, and the government reported that 93% of Albanians voted for it.

On 11 January 1946, Zog was officially deposed and Albania was proclaimed the People's Republic of Albania (renamed the People's Socialist Republic of Albania in 1976). As First Secretary of the party, Hoxha was de facto head of state and the most powerful man in the country.

Albanians celebrate their independence day on 28 November (which is the date on which they declared their independence from the Ottoman Empire in 1912), while in the former People's Socialist Republic of Albania the national day was 29 November, the day the country was liberated from the Italians. Both days are currently national holidays.

Early leadership (1946–1965) 

Hoxha declared himself a Marxist–Leninist and strongly admired Soviet leader Joseph Stalin. 
During the period of 1945–1950, the government adopted policies and actions intended to consolidate power which included extrajudicial killings and executions that targeted and eliminated anti-communists. 
The Agrarian Reform Law was passed in August 1945. It confiscated land from beys and large landowners, giving it without compensation to peasants. 52% of all land was owned by large landowners before the law was passed; this declined to 16% after the law's passage. Illiteracy, which was 90–95% in rural areas in 1939 and perhaps 85% of the total population in 1946,  fell to 30% by 1950, and by 1985 it was equal to that of a Western country.

By 1949, the US and British intelligence organisations were working with the former King Zog and the mountain men of his personal guard. They recruited Albanian refugees and émigrés from Egypt, Italy and Greece, trained them in Cyprus, Malta and the Federal Republic of Germany (West Germany), and infiltrated them into Albania. Guerrilla units entered Albania in 1950 and 1952, but they were killed or captured by Albanian security forces. Kim Philby, a Soviet double agent working as a liaison officer between MI6 and the CIA, had leaked details of the infiltration plan to Moscow, and the security breach claimed the lives of about 300 infiltrators.

On 19 February 1951, a bombing occurred at the Soviet embassy in Tirana, after which 23 accused intellectuals were arrested and put in prison. One of them, Jonuz Kaceli, was killed by Prime Minister Mehmet Shehu during interrogation. Subsequently, the 22 others were executed without trial under Hoxha's orders. They were later found to be innocent.

The State University of Tirana was established in 1957, which was the first of its kind in Albania. The medieval Gjakmarrja (blood feud) was banned. Malaria, the most widespread disease, was successfully fought through advances in health care, the use of DDT, and through the draining of swampland. From 1965 to 1985, no cases of malaria were reported, whereas previously Albania had the greatest number of infected patients in Europe. No cases of syphilis had been recorded for 30 years. In 1938 the number of physicians was 1.1 per 10,000 and there was only one hospital bed per 1,000 people. In 1950, while the number of physicians had not increased, there were four times as many hospital beds per head, and health expenditures had risen to 5% of the budget, up from 1% before the war.

Relations with Yugoslavia 

At this point, relations with Yugoslavia had begun to change. The roots of the change began on 20 October 1944 at the Second Plenary Session of the Communist Party of Albania. The Session considered the problems that the post-independence Albanian government would face. However, the Yugoslav delegation which was led by Velimir Stoinić accused the party of "sectarianism and opportunism" and blamed Hoxha for these errors. He also stressed the view that the Yugoslav Communist partisans spearheaded the Albanian partisan movement.

Anti-Yugoslav members of the Albanian Communist Party had begun to think that this was a plot by Tito who intended to destabilize the Party. Koçi Xoxe, Sejfulla Malëshova and others who supported Yugoslavia were looked upon with deep suspicion. Tito's position on Albania was that it was too weak to stand on its own and that it would do better as a part of Yugoslavia. Hoxha alleged that Tito had made it his goal to get Albania into Yugoslavia, firstly by creating the Treaty of Friendship, Co-operation and Mutual Aid in 1946. In time, Albania began to feel that the treaty was heavily slanted towards Yugoslav interests, much like the Italian agreements with Albania under Zog that made the nation dependent upon Italy.

The first issue was that the Albanian lek became revalued in terms of the Yugoslav dinar as a customs union was formed and Albania's economic plan was decided more by Yugoslavia. Albanian economists H. Banja and V. Toçi stated that the relationship between Albania and Yugoslavia during this period was exploitative and that it constituted attempts by Yugoslavia to make the Albanian economy an "appendage" to the Yugoslav economy. Hoxha then began to accuse Yugoslavia of misconduct:

Stalin advised Hoxha that Yugoslavia was attempting to annex Albania: "We did not know that the Yugoslavs, under the pretext of 'defending' your country against an attack from the Greek fascists, wanted to bring units of their army into the PRA [People's Republic of Albania]. They tried to do this in a very secretive manner. In reality, their aim in this direction was utterly hostile, for they intended to overturn the situation in Albania." By June 1947, the Central Committee of Yugoslavia began publicly condemning Hoxha, accusing him of taking an individualistic and anti-Marxist line. When Albania responded by making agreements with the Soviet Union to purchase a supply of agricultural machinery, Yugoslavia said that Albania could not enter into any agreements with other countries without Yugoslav approval.

Koçi Xoxe tried to stop Hoxha from improving relations with Bulgaria, reasoning that Albania would be more stable with one trading partner rather than with many. Nako Spiru, an anti-Yugoslav member of the Party, condemned Xoxe and vice versa. With no one coming to Spiru's defense, he viewed the situation as hopeless and feared that Yugoslav domination of his nation was imminent, which caused him to commit suicide in November.

At the Eighth Plenum of the Central Committee of the Party which lasted from 26 February to 8 March 1948, Xoxe was implicated in a plot to isolate Hoxha and consolidate his own power. He accused Hoxha of being responsible for the decline in relations with Yugoslavia and stated that a Soviet military mission should be expelled in favor of a Yugoslav counterpart. Hoxha managed to remain firm and his support had not declined. When Yugoslavia publicly broke with the Soviet Union, Hoxha's support base grew stronger. Then, on 1 July 1948, Tirana called on all Yugoslav technical advisors to leave the country and unilaterally declared all treaties and agreements between the two countries null and void. Xoxe was expelled from the party and on 13 June 1949, he was executed by hanging.

Relations with the Soviet Union 
After the break with Yugoslavia, Hoxha aligned himself with the Soviet Union. From 1948 to 1960, $200 million in Soviet aid was given to Albania for technical and infrastructural expansion. Albania was admitted to the Comecon on 22 February 1949 and served as a pro-Soviet force on the Adriatic. A Soviet submarine base was built on the Albanian island of Sazan near Vlorë, posing a hypothetical threat to the U.S. Sixth Fleet in the Mediterranean. Relations with the Soviet Union remained close until the death of Stalin in March 1953. It was followed by 14 days of national mourning in Albania – more than in the Soviet Union. Hoxha assembled the population of Tirana in the capital's largest square, which featured a Stalin statue, requested that they kneel and take a 2,000-word oath of "eternal fidelity" and "gratitude" to their "beloved father" and "great liberator".

Under Nikita Khrushchev, Stalin's eventual successor, aid was reduced and Albania was encouraged to adopt Khrushchev's specialisation policy. Under it, Albania would develop its agricultural output in order to supply the Soviet Union and other Warsaw Pact countries while they would be developing products of their own, which would, in theory, strengthen the Warsaw Pact. However, this also meant that Albanian industrial development, which was stressed heavily by Hoxha, would be hindered.

In May–June 1955, Nikolai Bulganin and Anastas Mikoyan visited Yugoslavia while Khrushchev renounced the expulsion of Yugoslavia from the Communist bloc. Khrushchev also began making references to Palmiro Togliatti's polycentrism theory. Hoxha had not been consulted on this and was offended. Yugoslavia began asking for Hoxha to rehabilitate the image of Koçi Xoxe, which Hoxha steadfastly rejected. In 1956 at the Twentieth Party Congress of the Communist Party of the Soviet Union, Khrushchev condemned the cult of personality that had been built up around Joseph Stalin and denounced his excesses. Khrushchev then announced the theory of peaceful coexistence, which angered the Stalinist Hoxha greatly. The Institute of Marxist–Leninist Studies, led by Hoxha's wife Nexhmije, quoted Vladimir Lenin: "The fundamental principle of the foreign policy of a socialist country and of a Communist party is proletarian internationalism; not peaceful coexistence." Hoxha now took a more active stand against perceived revisionism.

Unity within the Albanian Party of Labour began to decline as well, with a special delegate meeting held in Tirana in April 1956, composed of 450 delegates and having unexpected results. The delegates "criticized the conditions in the party, the negative attitude toward the masses, the absence of party and socialist democracy, the economic policy of the leadership, etc." while also calling for discussions on the cult of personality and the Twentieth Party Congress.

Movement towards China and Maoism 

In 1956, Hoxha called for a resolution which would confirm the existing leadership of the Party. The resolution was accepted, and all of the delegates who had spoken against it were expelled from the party and imprisoned. Hoxha claimed that Yugoslavia had attempted to overthrow the leadership of Albania. This incident increased Hoxha's power, effectively making Khrushchev-style reforms impossible there. In the same year, Hoxha travelled to China, then embroiled in the Sino-Soviet split, and met Mao Zedong. Chinese aid to Albania rose sharply during the next two years.

In an effort to keep Albania in the Soviet sphere, increased Soviet aid was given but relations with the Soviet Union remained at the same level until 1960, when Khrushchev met Sofoklis Venizelos, a liberal Greek politician. Khrushchev sympathised with the concept of an autonomous Greek North Epirus and he hoped to use Greek claims to keep the Albanian leadership in line. Hoxha reacted by only sending Hysni Kapo, a member of the Albanian Political Bureau, to the Third Congress of the Romanian Workers' Party in Bucharest, an event Communist heads of state were normally expected to attend. As relations between the two countries continued to deteriorate in the course of the meeting, Khrushchev said:

Friction with the Soviet Union 
Relations with the Soviet Union declined rapidly. A hardline policy was adopted and the Soviets reduced grain shipments at a time when Albania needed them due to the possibility of a flood-induced famine. In July 1960, a plot to overthrow the Albanian government was discovered. It was to be organised by Soviet-trained Rear Admiral Teme Sejko. After this, two pro-Soviet members of the Party, Liri Belishova and Koço Tashko, were expelled.

In August, the Party's Central Committee sent a protest to the Central Committee of the CPSU about having an anti-Albanian Soviet Ambassador in Tirana. The Fourth Congress of the Party, held from 13 to 20 February 1961, was the last meeting that the Soviet Union or other Eastern European nations attended in Albania. During the congress, Mehmet Shehu stated that while many members of the Party were accused of tyranny, this was a baseless charge and unlike the Soviet Union, Albania was led by genuine Marxists.

The Soviet Union retaliated by threatening "dire consequences" if the condemnations were not retracted. Days later, Khrushchev and Antonín Novotný, President of Czechoslovakia, threatened to cut off economic aid. In March, Albania was not invited to attend the meeting of the Warsaw Pact nations, and in April all Soviet technicians were withdrawn from Albania. In May nearly all Soviet troops at the Soviet submarine base were withdrawn.

On 7 November 1961, Hoxha made a speech in which he called Khrushchev a "revisionist, an anti-Marxist and a defeatist". Hoxha portrayed Stalin as the last Communist leader of the Soviet Union and alluded to Albania's independence. By 11 November, the USSR and every other Warsaw Pact nation broke diplomatic relations with Albania. Albania was unofficially excluded from the Warsaw Pact and Comecon. The Soviet Union also attempted to claim control of the submarine base. The Albanian Party then passed a law prohibiting any other nation from owning an Albanian port. The Soviet–Albanian split was now complete.

Later rule (1965–1985) 

As Hoxha's leadership continued, he took on an increasingly theoretical stance. He wrote criticisms which were based on theory and current events which occurred at the time; his most notable criticisms were his condemnations of Maoism after 1978. A major achievement under Hoxha was the advancement of women's rights. Albania had been one of the most, if not the most, patriarchal countries in Europe. The ancient Code of Lekë, which regulated the status of women, states, "A woman is known as a sack, made to endure as long as she lives in her husband's house." Women were not allowed to inherit anything from their parents, and discrimination was even made in the case of the murder of a pregnant woman:

Women were forbidden from obtaining a divorce, and the wife's parents were obliged to return a runaway daughter to her husband or else suffer shame which could even result in a generations-long blood feud. During World War II, the Albanian Communists encouraged women to join the partisans and following the war, women were encouraged to take up menial jobs, as the education necessary for higher level work was out of most women's reach. In 1938, 4% worked in various sectors of the economy. In 1970, this number had risen to 38%, and in 1982 to 46%.

During the Cultural and Ideological Revolution (discussed below), women were encouraged to take up all jobs, including government posts, which resulted in 40.7% of the People's Councils and 30.4% of the People's Assembly being made up of women, including two women in the Central Committee by 1985. In 1978, 15.1 times as many females attended eight-year schools as had done so in 1938 and 175.7 times as many females attended secondary schools. By 1978, 101.9 times as many women attended higher schools as in 1957. Hoxha said of women's rights in 1967:The entire party and country should hurl into the fire and break the neck of anyone who dared trample underfoot the sacred edict of the party on the defense of women's rights.In 1969, direct taxation was abolished and during this period the quality of schooling and health care continued to improve. An electrification campaign was begun in 1960 and the entire nation was expected to have electricity by 1985. Instead, it achieved this on 25 October 1970, making it the first nation with complete electrification in the world. During the Cultural & Ideological Revolution of 1967–1968 the military changed from traditional Communist army tactics and began to adhere to the Maoist strategy known as people's war, which included the abolition of military ranks, which were not fully restored until 1991. Mehmet Shehu said of the country's health service in 1979:

Hoxha's legacy also included a complex of 173,371 one-man concrete bunkers across a country of 3 million inhabitants, to act as look-outs and gun emplacements along with chemical weapons. The bunkers were built strong and mobile, with the intention that they could be easily placed by a crane or a helicopter in a hole. The types of bunkers vary from machine gun pillboxes, beach bunkers, to underground naval facilities and even Air Force Mountain and underground bunkers.

Hoxha's internal policies were true to Stalin's paradigm which he admired, and the personality cult which was developed in the 1970s and organised around him by the Party also bore a striking resemblance to that of Stalin. At times it even reached an intensity which was as extreme as the personality cult of Kim Il-sung (which Hoxha condemned) with Hoxha being portrayed as a genius commenting on virtually all facets of life from culture to economics to military matters. Each schoolbook required one or more quotations from him on the subjects being studied. The Party honored him with titles such as Supreme Comrade, Sole Force and Great Teacher. He adopted a different type military salute for the People's Army to render honors which was known as the Hoxhaist Salute, which involves soldiers curling their right fist and raising it to shoulder level. It replaced the Zogist salute, which was used by the Royal Albanian Army for many years.

Hoxha's governance was also distinguished by his encouragement of a high birthrate policy. For instance, a woman who bore an above-average number of children would be given the government award of Heroine Mother (in Albanian: Nënë Heroinë) along with cash rewards. Abortion was essentially restricted (to encourage high birth rates), except if the birth posed a danger to the mother's life, though it was not completely banned; the process was decided by district medical commissions. As a result, the population of Albania tripled from 1 million in 1944 to around 3 million in 1985.

Relations with China 

At the start of Albania's Third Five-year Plan, China offered Albania a loan of $125 million which would be used to build twenty-five chemical, electrical and metallurgical plants in accordance with the Plan. However, the nation discovered that the task of completing these building projects was difficult, because Albania's relations with its neighbors were poor and because matters were also complicated by the long distance between Albania and China. Unlike Yugoslavia or the USSR, China had less economic influence on Albania during Hoxha's rule. During the previous fifteen years (1946–1961), at least 50% of Albania's economy was dependent on foreign commerce.

By the time the 1976 Constitution was promulgated, Albania had mostly become self-sufficient but it lacked modern technology. Ideologically, Hoxha found that Mao's initial views were in line with Marxism-Leninism, due to his condemnation of Nikita Khrushchev's alleged revisionism and his condemnation of Yugoslavia. The financial aid which China provided to Albania was interest-free and it did not have to be repaid until Albania could afford to do so.

China never intervened in Albania's economic output, and Chinese technicians and Albanian workers both worked for the same wages. Albanian newspapers were reprinted in Chinese newspapers and they were also read on Chinese radio, and Albania led the movement to give the People's Republic of China a seat on the UN Security Council. During this period, Albania became the second largest producer of chromium in the world, which China considered important. Strategically, the Adriatic Sea was attractive to China, because China hoped that it could gain more allies in Eastern Europe through Albania - a hope which was misplaced. Zhou Enlai visited Albania in January 1964. On 9 January, "The 1964 Sino-Albanian Joint Statement" was signed in Tirana. The statement said of relations between socialist countries:

Like Albania, China defended the "purity" of Marxism by attacking US imperialism and "Soviet and Yugoslav revisionism", both of them were equally attacked as part of a "dual adversary" theory. Yugoslavia was viewed as both a "special detachment of U.S. imperialism" and a "saboteur against world revolution". However, these views began to change in China, which was one of the major issues which Albania had with the alliance. Additionally, unlike Yugoslavia and the Soviet Union, the Sino-Albanian alliance lacked "... an organisational structure for regular consultations and policy coordination, and it was also characterized by an informal relationship which was conducted on an ad hoc basis." Mao made a speech on 3 November 1966 in which he claimed that Albania was the only Marxist-Leninist state in Europe and in the same speech, he also stated that "an attack on Albania will have to reckon with the great People's Republic of China. If the U.S. imperialists, the modern Soviet revisionists or any of their lackeys dare to touch Albania in the slightest, nothing lies ahead for them but a complete, shameful and memorable defeat." Likewise, Hoxha stated that "You may rest assured, comrades, that come what may in the world at large, our two parties and our two peoples will certainly remain together. They will fight together and they will win together."

Shift in China's foreign policy after the Cultural Revolution 
During the Cultural Revolution, China entered into a four-year period of relative diplomatic isolation, however, its relations with Albania were positive. On 20 August 1968, the Soviet invasion of Czechoslovakia was condemned by Albania, along with the Brezhnev doctrine. Albania refused to send troops to Czechoslovakia in support of the invasion, and it officially withdrew from the Warsaw Pact on 5 September.

Albania's relations with China began to deteriorate on 15 July 1971, when United States President Richard Nixon agreed to visit China in order to meet with Zhou Enlai. Hoxha believed that China had betrayed Albania, and on 6 August, the Central Committee of the PLA sent a letter to the Central Committee of the CCP in which it called Nixon a "frenzied anti-Communist". The letter stated:

The result of this criticism was a message from the Chinese leadership in 1971 in which it stated that Albania could not depend on an indefinite flow of aid from China, and in 1972 Albania was advised to "curb its expectations about further Chinese contributions to its economic development". By 1972, Hoxha wrote in his diary Reflections on China that China was no longer a socialist country:

And in 1973, he wrote that the Chinese leaders:

In response, trade with COMECON (although trade with the Soviet Union was still blocked) and Yugoslavia grew. Trade with Third World nations was $0.5 million in 1973, but $8.3 million in 1974. Trade rose from 0.1% to 1.6%. Following Mao's death on 9 September 1976, Hoxha remained optimistic about Sino-Albanian relations, but in August 1977, Hua Guofeng, the new leader of China, stated that Mao's Three Worlds Theory would become official foreign policy. Hoxha viewed this as a way for China to justify having the U.S. as the "secondary enemy" while viewing the Soviet Union as the main one, thus allowing China to trade with the U.S. He stated that:
 From 30 August to 7 September 1977, Tito visited Beijing and was welcomed by the Chinese leadership. Following this, the PLA declared that China was now a revisionist state akin to the Soviet Union and Yugoslavia, and that Albania was the only Marxist–Leninist state on Earth. Hoxha stated:

On 13 July 1978, China announced that it was cutting off all of its aid to Albania. For the first time in modern history, Albania did not have an ally and it also did not have a major trading partner.

Political repression and emigration 

Certain clauses in the 1976 constitution circumscribed the exercise of political liberties which the government interpreted as being contrary to the established order. The government denied the population access to information other than that which was disseminated by government-controlled media outlets. Internally, the Sigurimi used the same repressive methods which were used by the NKVD, the MGB, the KGB and the East German Stasi. At one point, every third Albanian had either been interrogated by the Sigurimi or they had been incarcerated in labour camps. The government imprisoned thousands of people in forced-labour camps or it executed them for alleged crimes such as treachery or disrupting the proletarian dictatorship. After 1968, travel abroad was forbidden to all but those people who were on official business. Western European culture was looked upon with deep suspicion, resulting in bans on all unauthorised foreign materials and arrests. Art was required to reflect the styles of socialist realism. Beards were banned as unhygienic in order to curb the influence of Islam (many Imams and Babas had beards) and the Eastern Orthodox faith.

The justice system's legal proceedings regularly degenerated into show trials. An American human rights group described the proceedings of one trial: In order to lessen the threat of political dissidents and other exiles, relatives of the accused were often arrested, ostracised, and accused of being "enemies of the people". Political executions were common, and at least 5,000 people—possibly as many as 25,000—were killed by the regime. Torture was often used to obtain confessions:
During Hoxha's rule, there were six institutions for political prisoners and fourteen labour camps where political prisoners and common criminals worked together. It has been estimated that there were approximately 32,000 people imprisoned in Albania in 1985.

Article 47 of the Albanian Criminal Code stated that to "escape outside the state, as well as refusal to return to the Fatherland by a person who has been sent to serve or has been permitted temporarily to go outside the state" was an act of treason, a crime punishable by a minimum sentence of ten years and a maximum sentence of death. The Albanian government went to great lengths to prevent people from defecting by leaving the country:An electrically-wired metal fence stands 600 meters to one kilometer from the actual border. Anyone touching the fence not only risks electrocution, but also sets off alarm bells and lights which alert guards stationed at approximately one-kilometre intervals along the fence. Two meters of soil on either side of the fence are cleared in order to check for footprints of escapees and infiltrators. The area between the fence and the actual border is seeded with booby traps such as coils of wire, noise makers consisting of thin pieces of metal strips on top of two wooden slats with stones in a tin container which rattle if stepped on, and flares that are triggered by contact, thus illuminating would-be escapees during the night.

Religion 

Albania, the only predominantly Muslim country in Europe at that time, largely owing to Turkish influence in the region, had not, like the Ottoman Empire, identified religion with ethnicity. In the Ottoman Empire, Muslims were classified as Turks, Orthodox Christians were classified as Greeks, and Catholics were classified as Latins. Hoxha believed that this division of Albanian society along religious and ethnic lines was a serious issue, because it fueled Greek separatists in southern Albania in particular and it also divided the nation in general. The Agrarian Reform Law of 1945 confiscated much of the church's property in the country. Catholics were the earliest religious community to be targeted because the Vatican was considered an agent of Fascism and anti-Communism. In 1946 the Jesuit Order was banned and the Franciscans were banned in 1947. Decree No. 743 (On religion) sought the establishment of a national church and it also forbade religious leaders from associating with foreign powers.

Mother Teresa, a Catholic nun whose relatives resided in Albania during Hoxha's rule, was denied a chance to see them because she was considered a dangerous agent of the Vatican. Despite multiple requests and despite the fact that many countries made requests on her behalf, she was not granted the opportunity to see her mother and sister. Both Mother Teresa's mother and sister died during Hoxha's rule, and the nun herself was only able to visit Albania five years after the Communist regime collapsed. Dom Lush Gjergji in his book "Our Mother Teresa" describes one of her trips to the embassy where she was crying as she was leaving the building, saying:Dear God, I can understand and accept that I should suffer, but it is so hard to understand and accept why my mother has to suffer. In her old age she has no other wish than to see us one last time. 

The Party focused on atheist education in schools. This tactic was effective, primarily as a result of the high birthrate policy which was encouraged after the war. During periods which are considered "holy periods" by religious people, such as Lent and Ramadan, many foods and non-water beverages were distributed in schools and factories, and religious people who refused to eat those foods and drink those beverages when they were offered to them during their "fasting times" were denounced.

Starting on 6February 1967, the Party began to promote secularism in place of Abrahamic religions. Hoxha, who had launched a "Cultural and Ideological Revolution" after being partially inspired by China's Cultural Revolution, encouraged communist students and workers to use more forceful tactics in order to discourage people from continuing their religious practices, but the use of violence was initially condemned.

According to Hoxha, the surge in anti-theist activities began with the youth. The result of this "spontaneous, unprovoked movement" was the demolition or conversion of all 2,169 churches and mosques in Albania. State atheism became official policy, and Albania was declared the world's first atheist state. Town and city names which echoed Abrahamic religious themes were abandoned for neutral secular ones, as well as personal names. By 1968, Hoxha stated in a speech in that "Religion is a fuel kindling fires of all evils". During this period religiously based names were also made illegal. The Dictionary of People's Names, published in 1982, contained 3,000 approved, secular names. In 1992, Monsignor Dias, the Papal Nuncio for Albania appointed by Pope John Paul II, said that of the three hundred Catholic priests present in Albania prior to the Communists coming to power, only thirty were still active. The promotion of religion was banned and all clerics were labeled reactionaries and outlawed.  Those religious figures who refused to embrace the principles of Marxism–Leninism were either arrested or carried on their activities in hiding.

Cultivating nationalism 

During the anti-religious campaign, Enver Hoxha declared that "the only religion of Albania is Albanianism", a quotation from the poem O moj Shqiperi ("O Albania") by the 19th-century Albanian writer Pashko Vasa.

Muzafer Korkuti, one of the dominant figures in post-war Albanian archaeology and now the Director of the Institute of Archaeology in Tirana, said this in an interview on 10 July 2002:

Efforts were focused on an Illyrian-Albanian continuity issue.
An Illyrian origin of the Albanians (without denying Pelasgian roots) continued to play a significant role in Albanian nationalism, resulting in a revival of given names supposedly of "Illyrian" origin, at the expense of given names associated with Christianity. At first, Albanian nationalist writers opted for the Pelasgians as the forefathers of the Albanians, but as this form of nationalism flourished in Albania under Enver Hoxha, the Pelasgians became a secondary element to the Illyrian theory of Albanian origins, which could claim some support in scholarship.

The Illyrian descent theory soon became one of the pillars of Albanian nationalism, especially because it could provide some evidence of continuity of an Albanian presence both in Kosovo and Southern Albania, i.e. areas that were subject to ethnic conflicts between Albanians, Serbs and Greeks. Under the government of Enver Hoxha, an autochthonous ethnogenesis was promoted and physical anthropologists tried to demonstrate that Albanians were different from any other Indo-European populations, a theory now disproved. They claimed that the Illyrians were the most ancient people in the Balkans and greatly extended the age of the Illyrian language.

Rejecting Western mass media culture
Hoxha and his government were also hostile to Western popular culture as it was manifested in the mass media, along with the consumerism and cultural liberalism which were associated with it. In a speech on the Fourth Plenum of the Central Committee of the PLA (PLA-CC) on 26 June 1973, Hoxha declared a definitive break with any such Western bourgeois influence and what he described as its "degenerated bourgeois culture". In a speech in which he also criticised the "spread of certain vulgar, alien tastes in music and art", which ran "contrary to socialist ethics and the positive traditions of our people", including "degenerate importations such as long hair, extravagant dress, screaming jungle music, coarse language, shameless behaviour and so on", Hoxha declared:

Later life and death 

In 1974, Hoxha accused Beqir Balluku, Minister of Defence and longtime ally, of being an agent of China and attempting a coup d'état, since Balluku had criticized Hoxha's bunker program and stated that a U.S. and Soviet invasion of Albania was unlikely. Hoxha sentenced Balluku and a group of his accused associates to death and appointed Mehmet Shehu as Minister of Defence.

A new Constitution was decided upon by the Seventh Congress of the Albanian Party of Labour on 1–7 November 1976. According to Hoxha, "The old Constitution was the Constitution of the building of the foundations of socialism, whereas the new Constitution will be the Constitution of the complete construction of a socialist society."

Self-reliance was now stressed more than ever. Citizens were encouraged to train in the use of weapons, and this activity was also taught in schools. The purpose of this training was to encourage the creation of quick partisans.

Borrowing and foreign investment were banned under Article 26 of the Constitution, which read: "The granting of concessions to, and the creation of foreign economic and financial companies and other institutions or ones formed jointly with bourgeois and revisionist capitalist monopolies and states as well as obtaining credits from them are prohibited in the People's Socialist Republic of Albania." Hoxha said of borrowing money and allowing investment from other countries:

During this period, Albania was the most isolated country in Europe. In 1983, Albania imported goods which were worth $280 million but it exported goods which were worth $290 million, producing a trade surplus of $10 million.

In 1981, Hoxha ordered the execution of several party and government officials in a new purge. Prime Minister Mehmet Shehu, the second-most powerful man in Albania and Hoxha's closest comrade-in-arms for 40 years, was reported to have committed suicide in December 1981. He was subsequently condemned as a "traitor" to Albania and he was also accused of operating in the service of multiple intelligence agencies. It is generally believed that he was either killed or he shot himself during a power struggle which may have resulted from differing foreign policy matters with Hoxha. Hoxha also wrote a large assortment of books during this period, resulting in over 65 volumes of collected works, condensed into six volumes of selected works.

In 1973, Hoxha suffered a heart attack from which he never fully recovered. In increasingly precarious health from the late 1970s onward, he turned most state functions over to Ramiz Alia. In his final days, he was confined to a wheelchair and suffered from diabetes, with which he was diagnosed in 1948, along with cerebral ischemia, with which he was diagnosed in 1983. On 9 April 1985, he was struck by a ventricular fibrillation. Over the next 48 hours, he suffered repeated episodes of this arrhythmia, and he died in the early morning hours of 11 April 1985 at the age of 76. The Albanian government announced seven days of mourning with flags flown at half-mast and entertainment and cultural events cancelled.

Hoxha's body lay in state at the building of the Presidium of the People's Assembly for three days before he was buried on 15 April after a memorial service on Skanderbeg Square. The government refused to accept any foreign delegations during Hoxha's funeral and it even condemned the Soviet message of condolences as "unacceptable". After his burial, Hoxha was succeeded as head of state by Ramiz Alia, who gained control of the party's leadership two days later.

Hoxha left Albania with a legacy of isolation and fear of the outside world. Despite some economic progress which Albania made during Hoxha's rule, the country was in economic stagnation; Albania had been the poorest European country throughout much of the Cold War period.

Family 

The surname Hoxha is the Albanian variant of Hodja (from ), a title given to his ancestors due to their efforts to teach Albanians about Islam.

Hoxha's parents were Halil and Gjylihan (Gjylo) Hoxha, and Hoxha had three sisters, Fahrije, Haxhire and Sanije. Hysen Hoxha was Enver Hoxha's uncle and was a militant who campaigned vigorously for the independence of Albania, which occurred when Enver was four years old. His grandfather Beqir was involved in the Gjirokastër section of the League of Prizren.

Hoxha's son Sokol Hoxha was the CEO of the Albanian Post and Telecommunication service, and is married to Liliana Hoxha. Sali Berisha, a later democratic president of Albania, was often seen socialising with Sokol Hoxha and other close relatives of leading communist figures in Albania.

Hoxha's daughter, Pranvera, is an architect. Along with her husband, Klement Kolaneci, she designed the Enver Hoxha Museum in Tirana, a white-tiled pyramid. Some sources have referred to the edifice, said to be the most expensive ever constructed in Albanian history, as the "Enver Hoxha Mausoleum", though this was not an official appellation. The museum opened in 1988, three years after her father's death, and in 1991 was transformed into a conference centre and exhibition venue renamed Pyramid of Tirana.

Coup attempts 
The Mustafa Band was a gang connected to counter-revolutionary elements such as the Albanian mafia and members of the royal House of Zogu, and in 1982 attempted to assassinate Enver Hoxha. The plan failed and two of its members were killed and another one was arrested.

According to Hoxha, documents from long-time prime minister Mehmet Shehu's vault were found after his death in 1981 pertaining to orders by Yugoslav intelligence to poison him and assume the leadership of the country. In his book The Titoites, Hoxha hypotheses that this plan failed because Shehu was a coward who could not go through with the task and figured that suicide would, at the very least, save his family from the punishment for his counter-revolutionary activity.

Legacy 
A 2016 survey conducted by the Institute for Development Research and Alternatives (IDRA), showed that 45% of Albanians believe that Enver Hoxha had a positive impact on the history of Albania, whereas 42% see his impact as negative. Younger generations (16–35 years old; born after 1981) tend to have a more negative view of Hoxha's contributions, while older generations (over 35 years old; born before 1981) tend to have a more positive view. Citizens in the regions of southeastern and southwestern Albania that were interviewed, had the most positive view of Hoxha, with 50% and 55% respectively.

Awards 
Albania

Foreign Awards

Partial list of works

See also
 Albanian Resistance of World War II
 Autarky
 History of Albania
 Hoxhaism
 National Martyrs Cemetery of Albania
 Pyramid of Tirana

Further reading
 "Free - Coming of Age at the End of History" - Lea Ypi - Allen Lane - 2021: "a child's memoir into the death throes of the peculiar Albanian regime".

References

Sources

External links

 Enver Hoxha Reference Archive at marxists.org
 English collection of some of Hoxha's works
 Another English collection of some of Hoxha's works
 A Russian site with the works of Enver Hoxha
 Enver Hoxha tungjatjeta
 Disa nga Veprat e Shokut Enver Hoxha
 Albanian.com article on Hoxha
 Virtual Memory Museum Official Website 
 Enver Hoxha's Underground Bunker Official Website
 "Albania: Stalin's heir", Time, 22 December 1961
 Hoxha's State Funeral – 15 April 1985
 Albania Under Enver Hoxha (1982)

 
1908 births
1985 deaths
People from Gjirokastër
People from Janina vilayet
Albanian atheist writers
Albanian former Muslims
Labour Party of Albania politicians
Members of the Politburo of the Labour Party of Albania
Members of the Parliament of Albania
Government ministers of Albania
Prime Ministers of Albania
Defence ministers of Albania
Albanian generals
Albanian atheists
20th-century atheists
Albanian anti-fascists
Albanian revolutionaries
Stalinism
Hoxhaism
Anti-revisionists
Atheism activists
Critics of Christianity
Critics of Sunni Islam
Former Muslims turned agnostics or atheists
Male feminists
Natalism
Anti-Islam sentiment in Europe
People's Socialist Republic of Albania
Religious persecution by communists
Politicide perpetrators
Albanian National Lyceum alumni
University of Montpellier alumni
University of Paris alumni
World War II resistance members
Albanian people of World War II
Albanian resistance members
Recipients of the Order of Lenin
Recipients of the Order of Suvorov, 1st class
Recipients of the Order of the People's Hero